In cryptography, a preimage attack  on cryptographic hash functions tries to find a message that has a specific hash value. A cryptographic hash function should resist attacks on its preimage (set of possible inputs).

In the context of attack, there are two types of preimage resistance:

 preimage resistance: for essentially all pre-specified outputs, it is computationally infeasible to find any input that hashes to that output; i.e., given , it is difficult to find an  such that .
 second-preimage resistance: for a specified input, it is computationally infeasible to find another input which produces the same output; i.e., given , it is difficult to find a second input  such that .

These can be compared with a collision resistance, in which it is computationally infeasible to find any two distinct inputs ,  that hash to the same output; i.e., such that .

Collision resistance implies second-preimage resistance, but does not guarantee preimage resistance.

Applied preimage attacks 
By definition, an ideal hash function is such that the fastest way to compute a first or second preimage is through a brute-force attack. For an -bit hash, this attack has a time complexity , which is considered too high for a typical output size of  = 128 bits. If such complexity is the best that can be achieved by an adversary, then the hash function is considered preimage-resistant.

Faster preimage attacks can be found by cryptanalysing certain hash functions, and are specific to that function. Some significant preimage attacks have already been discovered, but they are not yet practical. If a practical preimage attack is discovered, it would drastically affect many Internet protocols. In this case, "practical" means that it could be executed by an attacker with a reasonable amount of resources. For example, a preimaging attack that costs trillions of dollars and takes decades to preimage one desired hash value or one message is not practical; one that costs a few thousand dollars and takes a few weeks might be very practical.

All currently known practical or almost-practical attacks on MD5 and SHA-1 are collision attacks. In general, a collision attack is easier to mount than a preimage attack, as it is not restricted by any set value (any two values can be used to collide). The time complexity of a brute-force collision attack, in contrast to the preimage attack, is only .

Restricted preimage space attacks
The computational infeasibility of a first preimage attack on an ideal hash function assumes that the set of possible hash inputs is too large for a brute force search.  However if a given hash value is known to have been produced from a set of inputs that is relatively small or is ordered by likelihood in some way, then a brute force search may be effective. Practicality depends on the input set size and the speed or cost of computing the hash function.

A common example is the use of hashes to store password validation data for authentication. Rather than store the plaintext of user passwords, an access control system stores a hash of the password. When a user requests access, the password they submit is hashed and compared with the stored value. If the stored validation data is stolen, the thief will only have the hash values, not the passwords. However most users choose passwords in predictable ways and many passwords are short enough that all possible combinations can be tested if fast hashes are used, even if the hash is rated secure against preimage attacks.  Special hashes called key derivation functions have been created to slow searches. See Password cracking.

See also 
 Birthday attack
 Cryptographic hash function
 Hash function security summary
 Rainbow table
 Random oracle
 : Attacks on Cryptographic Hashes in Internet Protocols

References 

Cryptographic attacks